Oscinella is a genus of flies in the family Chloropidae.

Species
O. agropyri Balachovsky & Mesnil, 1935
O. alopecuri Balachovsky & Mesnil, 1935
O. angularis Collin, 1946
O. angustipennis Duda, 1933
O. cariciphila Collin, 1946
O. exigua Collin, 1946
O. festucae Balachovsky & Mesnil, 1935
O. frit (Linnaeus, 1758)
O. grandissima (Sabrosky, 1940)
O. kroeberi Duda, 1935
O. maura (Fallén, 1820)
O. nartshukiana Beschovski, 1978
O. nigerrima (Macquart, 1935)
O. nitidigenis (Becker, 1908)
O. nitidissima (Meigen, 1838)
O. painteri Sabrosky, 1940 
O. phlei Nartshuk, 1955
O. pusilla (Meigen, 1830)
O. rubidipes Becker, 1910
O. smirnovi Nartshuk, 1955
O. trochanterata Collin, 1946
O. vastator (Curtis, 1845)
O. ventricosi Nartshuk, 1955
O. vindicata (Meigen, 1830)

References

Europe
Nearctic

Oscinellinae
Chloropidae genera
Articles containing video clips